Aristeus or Aristeas is the name of a number of people from classical antiquity. It may refer to:
 Aristeus, 5th century BCE Corinthian general
 Aristeus, son of Pellichus (possibly the same Pellichus immortalized in one of the sculptures of Demetrius of Alopece), also a military general from Corinth, was one of the commanders of the Corinthian fleet sent against Epidamnos in 436 BCE.
 Aristeus, a military commander from Sparta active around 423 BCE.
 Aristeus of Argos, son of Cheimon, won in the Dolichos event at the ancient Olympic games.

References

Peloponnesian War
Ancient Corinthians
5th-century BC Greek people
5th-century BC Spartans
Ancient Greek generals
Ancient Spartan generals
Ancient Olympic competitors